Beit Ummar is a Palestinian town located eleven kilometers northwest of Hebron in the Hebron Governorate of the State of Palestine. According to the Palestinian Central Bureau of Statistics, in 2016, the town had a population of 17,892 inhabitants. Over 4,800 residents of the town are under the age of 18. Since the Second Intifada, unemployment ranges between 60 and 80 percent due mostly to the inability of residents to work in Israel and a depression in the Palestinian economy. A part of the city straddles Road 60 and due to this, several propositions of house demolition have occurred.

Beit Ummar is mostly agricultural and is noted for its many grape vines. This has a major aspect on their culinary tradition of stuffed grape leaves known as waraq al-'inib and a grape syrup called dibs. Beit Ummar also has cherry, plum, apple and olive orchards.

History
Beit Ummar is believed to be the site of Biblical village of Maarath.

A church, tentatively dating to the 5th century CE, (but with changes probably done in 8th century) was excavated in the 1930s at Khirbat Asida, to the east of the centre of Beit Ummar.

According to some traditions, the town was named after the Islamic Caliph Umar ibn al-Khattab because he supposedly frequented the town. Many of the town's predominantly Muslim residents are descendants of Arab Christian families who converted during the 7th century Muslim conquest. Christian ruins in the old city are a testament to this conversion over 1,000 years ago.

The main mosque in Beit Ummar houses the tomb of Nabi Matta. Matta refers to Amittai, the father of Jonah. Mujir ad-Din writes that Matta was "a holy man from the people of the house of the prophecy." Nearby Halhul houses the purported tomb of Jonah with the inscription reading "Yunus ibn Matta" or "Jonah son of Amittai", confirming that Matta is indeed the Arabic name for Amittai (some suggested it referred to the apostle Matthew); the Beit Ummar tomb is dedicated to Amittai.

In 1226, the Ayyubid sultan al-Mu'azzam built a mosque with a minaret under the supervision of Jerusalem governor Rashid ad-Din al-Mu'azzami. The Mamluks constructed some additions to the mosque and engraved several inscriptions on its surface.

Ottoman era
In 1838, Edward Robinson noted the village from Al-Dawayima.

Victor Guérin visited the village in 1863, and found it to have about 450 inhabitants. Swiss orientalist Albert Socin, noting an official Ottoman village list circa 1870, wrote that Beit Ummar had a total of 44 houses and a population of 133, though the population count included only men. Hartmann found that Bet Ummar had 60 houses.

In 1883, the PEF's Survey of Western Palestine (SWP) described Beit Ummar as a "small but conspicuous village standing on the watershed, and visible from some distance on the north. An ancient road passes through it. Half a mile north-east is a good spring, ‘Ain Kufin. The mosque has a small tower to it. The surrounding neighbourhood is covered with brushwood."

British Mandate era
In the 1922 census of Palestine, conducted by the British Mandate authorities, Bait Ummar had a population of 829 inhabitants, all Muslims, increasing in the 1931 census to 1,135, still entirely Muslim, in 217 inhabited houses.

In the 1945 statistics the population of Beit Ummar was 80 Jews and 1,600 Muslims, and the total land area was 30,129 dunams of land, according to the official land and population survey. 2,912 dunams were plantations and irrigable land, 12,879 were for cereals, while 55 dunams were built-up (urban) land.

Jordanian era
In the wake of the 1948 Arab–Israeli War, and after the 1949 Armistice Agreements, Beit Ummar came under Jordanian rule. It was annexed by Jordan in 1950.

In 1961, the population of Beit Ummar was 2,103.

Post-1967

Since the Six-Day War in 1967, Beit Ummar has been under Israeli occupation. The population in the 1967 census conducted by the Israeli authorities was 2,630.

Beit Ummar became a municipality on April 17, 1997, after the dismantlement of the Israeli village council and Hussein Badr was appointed by the Palestinian National Authority. The current mayor is Nasri Sabarna. The town is currently located in Area B (civil affairs administered by the PNA) and Area C (civil and military affairs controlled by Israel). Israel has confiscated or expropriated approximately 4,000 dunams of village land in order to construct Israeli bypass roads and several Israeli settlements: Karmei Zur, Migdal Oz, Kfar Etzion and Efrat.

The town is governed by a municipal council consisting of thirteen members including the mayor.

Several people in the village have been shot and killed by Israeli soldiers or settlers during Israeli occupation. In January 2011, 17-year-old Yousef Ikhlayl was shot and killed during an altercation with Israeli settlers.

In August 2014, Hashem Abu Maria was killed by an IDF sharpshooter after a local protest turned into a riot. Two other Palestinians from Beit Ummar were also shot and killed.

In April 2015, 27-year-old Ziyad Awad was shot and killed in a demonstration which started after the funeral of his cousin.

Notable people
 Ali Abu Awwad

References

Bibliography

External links
Welcome To Bayt Ummar
Beit Ummar, Welcome to Palestine
Survey of Western Palestine, Map 21: IAA, Wikimedia commons 
Beit Ummar Town (Fact Sheet), Applied Research Institute–Jerusalem (ARIJ)
Beit Ummar Town Profile, (ARIJ)
Beit Ummar aerial photo, (ARIJ)
The priorities and needs for development in Beit Ummar town based on the community and local authorities’ assessment, (ARIJ)

Towns in the West Bank
Municipalities of West Bank